The 1982 Australia rugby union tour of New Zealand was a series of fourteen matches played by the Australia national rugby union team (nicknamed the Wallabies) in New Zealand between July and September 1982 . The Wallabies won ten of the fourteen matches and lost the other four. The international match series against the New Zealand national rugby union team (the All Blacks) resulted in a 2–1 win for New Zealand, who won the first and third matches, with Australia winning the second match. New Zealand thereby regained the Bledisloe Cup, which had been held by Australia since 1979.

The Australian touring party lacked international experience. Nine senior players were unavailable for the tour and seventeen of the thirty selected for the tour had not been capped by Australia previously. Only five of the sixteen forwards had played internationals. Despite losing the international series the tour proved good for the future of Australian rugby – in his assessment for Rothmans Rugby Yearbook New Zealand writer Don Cameron stated that "This represented the greatest triumph of all...Australia now has a deep fund of test-tried players". Amongst the new players selected by Australia was David Campese, who would go on to play for Australia 101 times and score 64 tries in international matches, which remains an Australia record as of 2015.

Matches
Scores and results list Australia's points tally first.

Touring party
Manager: Chilla Wilson
Assistant manager (Coach): Bob Dwyer
Captain: Mark Ella

Backs
Roger Gould
Glen Ella
David Campese
Peter Grigg
Michael Martin
Andrew Slack
P. Southwell
Gary Ella
Ross Hanley
Michael Hawker
Tim Lane
Mark Ella
Philip Cox
Dominic Vaughan

Forwards
Duncan Hall
Steve Tuynman
Chris Roche
Simon Poidevin
Peter Lucas
Ross Reynolds
Shane Nightingale
Steve Cutler
Phil Clements
Steve Williams
John Coolican
J. Griffiths
Andy McIntyre
John Meadows
Stan Pilecki
Bruce Malouf
Lance Walker

Notes

References
Steve Jones (ed), Rothmans Rugby Yearbook 1983–84, 

Australia
Australia national rugby union team tours of New Zealand
tour
tour
1982 in Oceanian rugby union

it:Tour della Nazionale di rugby a 15 dell'Australia 1980